The Olsvik Tunnel is a  long road tunnel in the city of Bergen in Vestland county, Norway.   The tunnel opened on 12 December 1992 and it is part of County Road 562.  The tunnel connects the southern end of the Askøy Bridge to National Road 555, one of the main highways in western Bergen.

References

Road tunnels in Bergen
Tunnels completed in 1992
1992 establishments in Norway
Norwegian County Road 562